The Bronze Age is a period in the Prehistoric Romanian timeline and is sub-divided into Early Bronze Age (c. 3500–2200 BC), Middle Bronze Age (c.2200–1600/1500 BC), and Late Bronze Age (c. 1600/1500–1100 BC).

Periodization 
Several Bronze Age chronologies have been applied to the Romanian area. An example would be the Periodization of Paul Reinecke for the Central European space, which split the Bronze Age into four phases (A, B, C and D) based upon the associations among the found bronze objects.

Features 

During the Bronze Age, there were some important developments from the Chalcolithic, with significant improvements in the economy.

The local bronze-aged economy was based on rearing livestock (sheep, goats and pigs). The Wietenberg culture reared large cattle and horses for both transportation and food.  At this time, the artistic output also significantly increased, for example the Gârla Mare culture who created intricate clay statuettes.

In the Early Bronze Age (c. 3500–2200 BC), we see the archaeological evidence of various cultures developing, including the Baden-Coţofeni culture, the Cernavodă III-Belleraz culture, the Glina-Schneckenberg culture and the Verbicioara culture.  Common occupations were agriculture, mining, and animal husbandry. Houses were rectangular and medium-sized. The last period of the Early Bronze Age produced a broad range of ornaments (loop rings, bracelets, necklaces, pendants comprising copper, gold, and silver and particularly bronze).

Verbicioara culture was identified in 1949 by the eponymous resort excavations.   Regarding burial customs, it was considered the beginning of the burial of the dead.

In the Middle Bronze Age (c.2200–1600/1500 BC), the population of Romania and neighboring countries was demarcated by the appearance of several major cultures. Some that stand out include the Otomani culture (seen also in Slovakia), Wietenberg culture (seen in Transylvania), Mureş culture, and Gârla Mare culture (from which impressive clay figurines and statuettes have been found).

Religion 

The Bronze Age introduced solar, or Uranian, cults. Some ornaments, considered to be solar symbols, were frequently pictured on ceramic or metal parts: concentric circles, circles accompanied by rays, and the swastika. Cremation is considered to be connected to these cults.

In the Romanian territory, there are three known bronze-aged sanctuaries: Sălacea, Bihor County (Ottomány culture, phase II). The only cultures of this area well represented in this regard are the Gârla Mare Zuto Brdo culture and the Bijelo Szeremle Brdo-Dalj culture (also present in Hungary and Croatia). About 340 pieces were found in the area of the two cultures, of which 244 are in the Gârla Mare area.

Clay miniature axes (axes, hammers or double axes) belonging to this period have been found. Labrys double-axes are frequently found in the Cretan and Mycenaean worlds, where they occur most often in complex rituals and tombs (for example the Tomb of double ax of Knossos). In the Mycenaean context, the labrys has a wide range of sizes, from miniature forms to giant forms that measure 1.20 meters. However, the labrys site is frequently associated with the moon and can be a symbol of a goddess of vegetation, the forerunner of Demeter, who, on Mycenaean seals, is found under a tree. The goddess has an ax in her hand and receives as gifts poppies and fruits.

Gallery

See also 

 Bronze Age in Transylvania
 Bronze Age in Southeastern Europe
 Bronze Age in Europe
 Basarabi culture
 Coțofeni culture
 Otomani culture
 Pecica culture
 Wietenberg culture
 Celts in Transylvania
 Getae
 Rotbav Archaeological Site

Notes

References 

 Cristian Ștefan - Epoca Bronzului
 Ioan Aurel-Pop, Ioan Bolovan, coordinatings - Istoria ilustrată a României

External links 

 https://web.archive.org/web/20110913223325/http://prehistoire.e-monsite.com/rubrique%2Cepoca-bronzului-ii%2C1112106.html
 https://web.archive.org/web/20120317115249/http://www.archaeology.ro/imc_verb.htm
 https://web.archive.org/web/20110927235724/http://www.archaeology.ro/imc_mont.htm

Bronze Age Europe by country
Prehistory of Romania
Archaeology of Romania